Ashima Patra is an Indian politician. She served as Minister of State (Independent Charge) for Technical Education of West Bengal from 2016 to 2021 and currently serving as Member of Legislative Assembly for Dhaniakhali since 2011.

Career

MLA
She was elected as the Member of the Legislative Assembly from Dhanekhali (Vidhan Sabha constituency) since year 2011.

Minister in West Bengal
She served as the Minister of State of the Department of Technical Education, Training and Skill Development (Independent charge) of West Bengal Government in Mamata Banerjee ministry (2016–2021) in the years between 2016 – 2017.

Between 2017 and 2018, she also served as the Minister of State of the Department of Planning, Statistics and Programme Monitoring (Independent charge) Welfare of West Bengal Government in Mamata Banerjee ministry.

Since 2017, she has been the Minister of State of the Department of Backward Classes of West Bengal Government in Mamata Banerjee ministry (2016–2021).

Since 2016, she has been the Minister of State of the Department of Fisheries of West Bengal Government in Mamata Banerjee ministry (2016–2021)

References

Portfolios 

 

1969 births
Living people
Trinamool Congress politicians from West Bengal
West Bengal MLAs 2016–2021